Tulasi Dalam is a Telugu thriller novel written by Yandamuri Veerendranath. It was published in Andhra Bhoomi weekly in 1980 as a serial and got tremendous popularity. It was republished many times as a paperback and sold approximately 50,000 copies.  It was one of the initial novels of Yandamuri that became popular and he was appreciated widely for his narrating style. It was partially inspired by the 1971 bestselling novel The Exorcist. Tulasi Dalam was first adapted into a 1985 Kannada movie titled Thulasidala and later in Telugu as Tulasidalam (1989),in Hindi as Phoonk (2008) and its remake in Telugu as Raksha (2008).In 1986, a story based on this novel called Kashmora was filmed for which Yendamuri Verendranath has worked as writer.

Plot
Sridher was a self made millionaire, working as one of the directors of a multi national company. He was happily married to Sharada and lives in a peaceful neighborhood of Hyderabad. His younger sister Anita and Sharada's mute brother Narayana Rao stay with them. Approximately eight years after their marriage, Sharada conceives and immediately after that Sridher loses his ability to beget a child after an accident. They name their daughter Tulasi and raise her with utmost affection. When Tulasi was six years old, Sridher saves his employer, Richard's grandchild from a fatal accident. Richard later leaves India and arranges that Tulsi will get twenty lakhs (two million rupees) on her tenth birthday. His will says that if she dies before that, money would go to an orphanage run by Chidananda Swami.

Sridher's company plans to send him along with his family to Paris to help their business there and Sridher happily agrees. Minutes before their departure, Tulasi suddenly becomes ill, postponing their journey. Later that night, she starts to show strange symptoms, indefinitely postponing their tour. It all happens when she was about to turn ten in two months. She shows varying symptoms everyday, puzzling experienced physicians. Their family members resort to various conventional and non conventional methods to save her while doctors are attempting their best. Finally, Sharada turns to a famous hypnotist Jayadev whereas Sridher turns to Santhaan Fakir, a paranormal expert. They both try their best to save Tulasi whereas Anita decides to go in a completely different way. In the climax, Sridher goes to Odissa along with his engineer Brahmin and his lawyer Vidyapathi to stop the evil Kadra, while Sharada and Jayadev stay with her to protect her from receiving evil hypnotic signals. Climax deals with whether they succeeded in saving Tulasi and by what means they save her.

Reception 
Tulasi Dalam gained wide popularity and acclaim when it was published as a weekly serial. It helped Yandamuri to establish himself as a professional writer. Though many critics panned it saying that it was helping to re-popularize the forgotten superstitions regarding witchcraft, it remained as one of the best selling novels in Telugu literature.

Films

Tulasi Dalam was first adapted into a 1985 Kannada movie titled Thulasidala directed by Vemagal Jagannath Rao starring Sarath Babu and Aarthi.
Later it was adapted into the Hindi film Phoonk (2008) and the Telugu film Raksha (2008).

Television series
Tulasi Dalam was made into a soap in 1999-2000, aired on Gemini TV. It was directed by Yandamuri and also received many awards including Nandi Award.
It was also adopted in a daily soap aired on Star Maa but it was not as successful because the makers lost the natural and organic base of the plot.

Sequel 
It was followed by sequel Tulasi which starts after ten years of the initial events.

References

External links
 Tulasidalam book at Scribd.com
 Tulasidalam film at Bharat Movies.com

20th-century Indian novels
Novels about exorcism
Indian novels adapted into films
Indian horror fiction
Indian novels adapted into television shows
Indian thriller novels
Telugu novels
Horror novels